The 2009 AON Open Challenger was a professional tennis tournament played on outdoor red clay courts. It was the seventh edition of the tournament which was part of the 2009 ATP Challenger Tour. It took place in Genoa, Italy between 7 and 13 September 2009.

Singles main draw entrants

Seeds

 Rankings are as of August 31, 2009.

Other entrants
The following players received wildcards into the singles main draw:
  Daniele Bracciali
  Grigor Dimitrov
  Thomas Fabbiano

The following players received entry from the qualifying draw:
  Carlos Berlocq
  Artem Smirnov
  Walter Trusendi
  Roman Valent

Champions

Singles

 Alberto Martín def.  Carlos Berlocq, 6–3, 6–3

Doubles

 Daniele Bracciali /  Alessandro Motti def.  Amir Hadad /  Harel Levy, 6–4, 6–2

External links
Official site
ITF Search 

AON Open Challenger
AON Open Challenger
Clay court tennis tournaments
21st century in Genoa
September 2009 sports events in Europe
2009 in Italian tennis